Thornton W. Burgess Museum was a museum in East Sandwich, Massachusetts dedicated to the conservationist and children's book author Thornton W. Burgess (1874–1965). The museum is reported closing as of 2013 due to lack of funds to acquire and maintain the property.

References

External links
Official website

Biographical museums in Massachusetts
Burgess, Thornton
Museums in Barnstable County, Massachusetts
Defunct museums in Massachusetts
Museums disestablished in 2013